The College of Foreign Languages and Literature (abbreviated NCCU CFLL) at National Chengchi University (NCCU) was established in 1989.
The college was detached from the "College of Liberal Arts" in 1989. NCCU CFLL is the first public college of foreign languages and literature established and also regarded nationally as one of the best CFLL in Taiwan. 

Now, there are 7 departments, 5 graduate institutes, 3 research centers in the college and it provides programs in over 26 languages.

Departments
Department of English
Department of Japanese
Department of Slavic Languages and Literature
Department of Arabic Languages and Literature
Department of Korean Language and Culture
Department of Turkish Language and Culture
Department of European Languages and Culture

Graduate Institutes
Graduate Institute of Linguistics
Graduate Institute of English
Graduate Institute of Japanese
Graduate Institute of Slavic Studies
Graduate Institute of Korean Studies (Supported by the Academy of Korean Studies)

Degree Program
Southeast Asia Language and Culture (Bachelor's degree)
Middle Eastern and Central Asian Studies (Master's degree)

Research Centers
Foreign Language Center
Translation Center
Cross-cultural Studies Center
Foreign Language Center of Northern Taiwan (in cooperation with the Ministry of Education)

Language Proficiency Test
Vietnamese (in cooperation with Vietnam National University, Hanoi)
Arabic
Turkish
Thai language

Rankings

QS World University Rankings
By Subject
English Language and Literature: 201-250
Linguistics: 101-150
Modern Language: 101-150

References

External links
 NCCU College of Foreign Languages and Literature 
 

1989 establishments in Taiwan
Educational institutions established in 1989
College of Foreign Literature and Languages